Come to the Well is the fifth studio album by American contemporary Christian band Casting Crowns, released on October 18, 2011, through Beach Street and Reunion Records. The album, which has a predominantly pop rock and rock sound, was based on the Biblical story of the woman at the well. In writing the album, lead vocalist Mark Hall collaborated with songwriters Steven Curtis Chapman, Matthew West, and Tom Douglas. The album received mostly positive reviews from critics, many of whom praised the album's songwriting, and received the award for Top Christian Album at the 2012 Billboard Music Awards.

Although it was projected to debut at number one on the Billboard 200 by music industry analysts, Come to the Well debuted at number two on the chart and number one on the Christian Albums chart with first-week sales of 99,000 units. It also debuted on the Canadian Albums Chart at number sixty-nine and appeared at number eight on the New Zealand Albums Chart in 2012 following the band's appearance at the 2012 Parachute Music Festival. The album has sold over 779,000 copies and has received a Gold certification from the Recording Industry Association of America (RIAA). The album's lead single, "Courageous", peaked at number one on the Billboard Christian Songs chart and at number four on the Bubbling Under Hot 100 Singles chart.

Background and recording

According to Casting Crowns' lead vocalist Mark Hall, the concept for Come to the Well is the song "The Well". Hall wrote the song based on the Biblical story of "woman at the well and the fact that she was standing there talking to Jesus about water and Jesus was talking to her about water, but they weren't talking about the same water". Hall noted that, in his life, "when I come to Jesus, I've already got my well figured out, I've already got what I think is going to sustain me, I just need him to sprinkle some magic Jesus dust on it and make it work. We have our wells figured and we want Jesus to fix our wells, but our wells are really holes in the ground". Hall argued that instead of using that approach, Christians should "start with Jesus, then we go to the world", and said that approach is what the album is about. In writing the album, Hall worked with outside songwriters Steven Curtis Chapman, Matthew West, and Tom Douglas on several tracks; he received writing credit on eleven out of the album's twelve tracks, the exception being "Face Down", which was penned by Hector Cervantes and Marc Byrd.

Come to the Well was produced by Mark A. Miller. It was recorded and mixed by Sam Hewitt at Zoo Studio in Franklin, Tennessee. Additional vocals were recorded by Billy Lord at Eagle's Landing Studio in McDonough, Georgia, while additional recording was conducted at Lifesong Studio in McDonough. The string tracks on the album, which were arranged by David Davidson, were recorded at Ocean Way Studio in Nashville, Tennessee by Bobby Shin. It was mastered by Andrew Mendelson at Georgetown Masters in Nashville. The album was submixed by Shin at ShinShack Studio in Nashville.

Musical style and songwriting
Come to the Well has been described as a pop rock and rock album; it has also been described as being a pop and worship album.

Tracks 1–6

Opening track "Courageous", a pop rock and soft rock song, was described by Hall as an "anthem of encouragement. It’s one brother reminding all of God’s men we were meant for greatness, and that greatness is defined in contagious and courageous abandonment to Jesus".

"City on the Hill", described as "lush" and "string-laden", is a critique of denominationalism in the Christian church; Hall described the song as an "allegory of the factions of the modern Church, the result of predominantly like-minded people often dwelling upon non-essentials and personal taste to go their own direction".

"Jesus, Friend of Sinners" "admonishes the Christian church to show compassion" and "laments how the world knows many Christ followers more by what they are against than what they are for". Although Hall called the song "one of the more direct songs [Casting Crowns has] written", he said "it also speaks truth. And I think believers should speak truth to each other as long as we do it in love".

"Already There", described as "echoing "Clocks"-era Coldplay", relates the concept that "God is already sitting at the end of your life looking back at it". "The Well", regarded by Hall as the "heart of the entire album", highlights the "life-giving love of Jesus" as opposed to "dried up empty religion".

"Spirit Wind" incorporates a folk rock sound with influences from country music. The song, one of the first songs Mark Hall ever wrote, was written after Hall saw a pastor at a church in Alabama preach the story of Ezekiel and the valley of dry bones to a church that Hall described as one of the "deadest churches" he had ever seen. The song's verse structure goes from "Ezekiel in the first verse to the country preacher in the second verse and finally to a prayer for God to raise his Church again as a mighty army [in the third verse]".

Tracks 7–12

"Just Another Birthday", sung by Megan Garrett, is a mid-tempo ballad. The song was written to "shake up some fathers and remind them of their true priorities" and to "encourage kids out there who don’t have an involved dad here on Earth".

"Wedding Day" features a "soaring melody". According to Hall, the song "anticipates the thrill of reveling in the presence of God as the Bride of Christ", a theme Hall felt is rarely addressed in modern music. "Angel" was written for Hall's wife, Melanie, and references the first time Hall met her as well as their wedding day.

"My Own Worst Enemy" has a "grungy" rock sound. Hall felt the song's sound, which he described as perhaps the heaviest song Casting Crowns have ever made, was fitting due to the song's lyrical theme of the inner battle with sin.

"Face Down" is the only song on the album which was not co-written by Hall, The album's final song, "So Far to Find You", was written by Hall and Steven Curtis Chapman about Hall's adopted daughter, Meeka Hope.

Release and promotion
Prior to the release of Come to the Well, "Courageous" was released as a digital download on July 19, 2011 and to Christian radio on August 13, 2011. The single topped the Billboard Christian Songs chart and peaked at number four on the Bubbling Under Hot 100 Singles chart. Come to the Well was released on October 18, 2011. The album was projected to sell anywhere from 95,000 copies to upwards of 110,000 copies in its first week of sales in the United States. Although industry analysts predicted the album would top the Billboard 200 chart, it ultimately debuted at number two on the Billboard 200 with sales of 99,000 units, blocked by Adele's album 21. The album also debuted at number one on the Christian Albums chart, number two on the Digital Albums chart, and number sixty-nine on the Canadian Albums Chart. In its second week, the album sold 30,000 copies in the United States, dropping to number ten on the Billboard 200 chart. The album held the top spot on the Christian Albums chart for four consecutive weeks following its release and for ten non-consecutive weeks from December 2011 to November 2012. By February 2012, the album had sold 601,000 copies in the United States, according to Nielsen SoundScan.  Following the band's appearance at the 2012 Parachute Music Festival in New Zealand, Come to the Well debuted at number eight on the New Zealand Albums Chart. The album's second single, "Jesus, Friend of Sinners", was released to Christian radio on March 3, 2012. As of March 2014, the album has sold 779,000 copies.

Critical reception and accolades

Come to the Well received mostly positive reviews from music critics. James Christopher Monger of Allmusic gave the album three-and-a-half out of four stars, praising the album's opening songs but critiquing the album's "mid-section" for having songs that "feel a bit tacked on". Tom Frigoli of Alpha Omega News gave the album a grade of an A, praising the album for containing "everything they’ve come to love and more with several radio-friendly songs." Jonathan Faulkner of Alt Rock Live gave the album a seven out of ten stars, commenting that the album "is defiantly a step in the right" direction. Grace S. Aspinwall of CCM Magazine gave the album four out of five stars, praising the overall quality of the album and commending the band for "staying true to themselves". Robert Ham of Christianity Today  gave the album three out of five stars, critiquing the album for "sticking to the well-trodden road of modern worship". Tom Lennie of Cross Rhythms gave Come to the Well nine out of ten stars, praising the album's music and lyrics for being "impacting" and "making for much more than just an enjoyable listen". Jonathan Andre of Indie Vision Music gave the album three out of five stars, calling it a "thought-provoking album, about how society wants the temporary fix". Caldwell of Jesus Freak Hideout gave the album four out of five stars, describing it as "skillfully walk[ing] the thin tightrope act of balancing a heart for ministry and discipleship with a broadly appealing (if sometimes too broadly appealing) pop rock soundtrack".

Schexnayder of Jesus Freak Hideout gave a second staff opinion rating of three-stars-out-of-five, and wrote that "Come To The Well is not an unbearable musical venture, and it’s likely one of their better recent releases. Although their music may not be of the highest quality, those looking for lyrics that go deeper than your average contemporary worship band should consider giving at least some of Casting Crowns’ latest a listen." Davies of Louder Than the Music gave it a three and a half out of five stars, noting that "there is absolutely nothing wrong with this album", which he expects more out of the band, advising that with "a little bit more creativity musically and this could be a really strong album." Kevin Davis of New Release Tuesday gave it a four out of five stars, evoking how the album is "filled with songs that both challenge and encourage believers in their walk", and calling it "the best album by Casting Crowns since Lifesong". Bert Gangl of The Phantom Tollbooth gave it a three and a half out of five stars, writing that the album "taken as a whole, the new record, in spite of its intermittent musical tangents – or perhaps because of them – winds up being one of the Crown collective's most cohesive, and impressive, releases to date." Ed Cardinal of Crosswalk.com said the album was "as strong and yet relatively safe as anything it has done before" and praised it as "sure to be among 2011’s most popular and enduring Christian albums". Lindsay Williams of Gospel Music Channel praised the album's songwriting and said the album "is a solid effort in the Crowns discography". Barry Westman of Worship Leader praising the album for its "variety in styles adds to the complexity of the album, and keeps the listener wondering what will come next." At the 2012 Billboard Music Awards, the album received the award for Top Christian Album. Come to the Well has been nominated for the Grammy Award for Best Contemporary Christian Music Album at the 55th Grammy Awards, while "Jesus, Friend of Sinners" has received nominations for Best Gospel/Contemporary Christian Music Performance and Best Contemporary Christian Music Song.

Track listing

Personnel 
Credits adapted from the liner notes.

Casting Crowns
 Mark Hall – vocals 
 Megan Garrett – acoustic piano, keyboards, backing vocals 
 Hector Cervantes – electric guitar
 Juan DeVevo – acoustic guitar, electric guitar
 Melodee DeVevo – violin, backing vocals
 Chris Huffman – bass
 Brian Scoggin – drums

Additional musicians
 Bernie Herms – keyboards, programming
 Gregg "Hobie" Hubbard – keyboards 
 Blair Masters – keyboards, programming
 Stu G – electric guitar
 Jason Hoard – electric guitar, acoustic guitar
 Adam Lester – acoustic guitar
 Dale Oliver – electric guitar
 Mike Payne – electric guitar
 Jason Roller – acoustic guitar, electric guitar, banjo
 Adam Nitti – bass
 Bobby Huff – drums, percussion
 Jacob Schrodt – drums, percussion

String section
 David Davidson – arrangements, leader
 John Catchings and Anthony LaMarchina – cello
 Jack Jezioro – string bass
 Monisa Angell and Kristin Wilkinson – viola
 David Angell, Janet Darnall, David Davidson, Conni Ellisor, Pamela Sixfin, Mary Kathryn Vanoddale and Karen Winkelmann – violin

Technical
 Sam Hewitt – recording, mixing
 Michael Hewitt – additional recording, recording assistant, mix assistant, digital editing
 Billy Lord – additional vocal recording
 Michael France – additional vocal recording assistant 
 Eric Jackson – additional vocal recording assistant 
 Baheo "Bobby" Shin – string recording, sub mixing
 Matt Naylor – string recording assistant, digital editing
 Andrew Mendelson – mastering at Georgetown Masters (Nashville, Tennessee)
 Natthaphol Abhigantaphand – mastering assistant
 Shelley Anderson – mastering assistant
 Daniel Bacigalupi – mastering assistant
Michael France - vocal recording
Eric Jackson - vocal recording

Production
 Mark A. Miller – producer 
 Terry Hemmings – executive producer
 Jason McArthur – A&R
 Jason Root – A&R Production
 Beth Lee – art direction 
 Tim Parker – art direction, design 
 David Dobson – photography 
 Anna Redmon – wardrobe 
 Katherine Roberts Berger – grooming 
 Edward St. George – grooming
 Diana Luster – business manager 
 Frank Miller – business manager 
 Kelli Miller – assistant business manager 
 O-Seven Artist Management – business management 
 Proper Management – management

Charts

Album charts

Singles

Certifications

References
Notes

Footnotes

Reunion Records albums
Casting Crowns albums
2011 albums
John 4